Sylvia Chang (born 21 July 1953) is a Taiwanese actress, writer, singer, producer and director. In 1992, she was a member of the jury at the 42nd Berlin International Film Festival. In 2018, she was one of the jury members of the main competition section at the 75th Venice International Film Festival.

Early life
Chang was born in Chiayi, Taiwan. She dropped out of school when she was 16, and started her career as a radio DJ. When she was 18 years old she acted in her first film.

Career
Chang acted in her first film, The Tattooed Dragon (龍虎金剛) (1973), when she was 18 years old. Chang often attempted to do her own stunts in the four-part film series Aces Go Places.

She stated in an interview with film editor Clarence Tsui, "I still think Hong Kong's film industry is male-dominated". She also believes that "There aren't many male filmmakers who would write scripts for women". She helped write the script of Run Papa Run, based on the novel by Benny Li Shuan Yan, that follows a man who belongs to the Triad and the relationship he has with his mother, wife, and daughter. Chang said in an interview that, "I thought why don't I explore the gentler side of men".

Chang first began performing in theatre productions more than 30 years ago. She returned to the stage   in the production of Design For Living that premiered in November 2008 and went on into 2009.  Chang stated in an interview that, "The reason for me to take on stage play again after 20 years is because I was lured by the director, he has invited handsome guys like Zheng Yuan Chang [sic] and David Huang into the play". Critics have remarked upon the versatility in her roles along with her willingness to always try for something new.

Chang is also a singer and her music has become popular in karaoke, where her song "The Cost of Love" is commonly sung.

In the 1980s, Chang's second film to direct, Passion, which she wrote and also starred in, won the Hong Kong Film Award for Best Actress. She has stated, "I had never went to any school as a director or a filmmaker, so all my film education actually was from the set".

For a time, Chang was the head producer of New Cinema City in Taiwan, but left a few years after joining.  In 20 30 40, she played the 40-year-old woman protagonist, wrote and directed it.

Critical reception
Chang once said of her films that, "I've always felt that animation or special effects shouldn't just be limited to science-fiction films and their ilk. Dramas can also play around with them". One critic wrote of her, that "In an industry that kisses young actresses with celebrity, then swallows them and spits them out, Chang has a sequoia's longevity. She is the only Hong Kong actress of her generation—the early '70s—to keep starring in movies".

Chang's films have been accepted into the London and Toronto International film Festivals. She has served on the jury for the Berlin Film Festival. She also holds the record for the most nominations for Hong Kong Film Award for Best Actress, with nine nominations and 2 wins.

Personal life
Chang married Hong Kong-based journalist Bob Liu in 1979.  They divorced in 1984.  Chang married Taiwanese businessman Billy Wang Jing-xiong in 1991 and they have one son, Oscar. She also has two stepsons.

In July 2000, Chang's nine-year-old son Oscar was kidnapped and held for a ransom of HK $15 million. The police found him after a few days, safe, and arrested the kidnappers. Chang stated, "With your life, you have to move on, there's no other choice; so, out of no choice, then, it's a matter of your attitude".

Philanthropy
Chang is an advocate and a "life-long volunteer" for World Vision International, the humanitarian aid, development, and advocacy organization. She created an advertisement, sponsored by World Vision, to promote the company, . She is a member and advocate for the World Vision-sponsored "30 Hour Famine."

Filmography

As actress 

 Kong zhong wu shi (1973)
 The Tattooed Dragon (1973) as Ai-Chia
 Xiao ying xiong da nao Tang Ren jie (1974) as Lin Hsiu-yin
 Slaughter in San Francisco (1974)
 Shi qi shi qi shi ba (1974)
 Bruce: Hong Kong Master (1975)
 The Story of Four Girls (1975)
 A Mao zheng chuan (1976)
 Bi yun tian (1976)
 Victory (1976)
 Wen nuan zai qiu tian (1976) as Hsu Hsiao-hui
 Eight Hundred Heroes (1976)
 Warmth in Autumn (1976)
 Qiu chan (1976)
 Lang hua (1976)
 Xing yu (1976)
 Luo ye piao piao (1976)
 The Lady Killer (1976)
 Mitra (1977) as Mitra
 The Longest Bridge (1977)
 The Golden Age (1977)
 A Pirate of Love (1977)
 Zuo ri chong chong (1977)
 Qing se shan mai (1977)
 Shan liang de ri zi (1977)
 Tai bei qi qi (1977)
 Taibei liu shi liu (1977)
 Jin yu liang yuan hong lou meng (1977) as Lin Daiyu
 Feng yu zhao yang (1977)
 Dan dan san yue qing meng long (1977)
 Ai qing wo zhao dao le (1977)
 Shuo huang shi jie (1978)
 M*A*S*H (1979, TV Series) as Sooni
 The Secret (1979) - Lin Jeng-ming.
 Legend of the Mountain (1979) as Cloud
 Crazy Disaster (1979) as Lin Jeng-ming
 Ma feng nu (1979)
 Tian xia yi da xiao (1980)
 The Imperious Princess (1980) as Princess Sheng Ping
 White Jasmine (1980)
 Da xiao jiang jun (1980)
 Xue jian leng ying bao (1980)
 Yuan (1980)
 Attack Force Z (1981) as Chien Hua
 Zhong shen da shi (1981) as Chu Wei
 The Funniest Movie (1981)
 My Grandfather (1982)
 Aces Go Places (1982) as Supt. Nancy Ho
 Nan xiong nan di (1982)
 Xue jian gui xiang lu (1982)
 He Lives by Night (1982) as Sissy
 In Our Time (1982)
 Aces Go Places 2 (1983) as Supt. Nancy Ho
 1938 Da jing qi (1983) as Su San
 Cabaret of the Streets (1983)
 That Day, on the Beach (1983) as Jiali
 Cabaret Tears (1983)
 Aces Go Places 3 (1984) as Supt. Nancy Ho
 Funny Face (1984)
 Shanghai Blues (1984) as Shu-Shu
 Double Trouble (1984)
 The Story in Sorghum Field (1984)
 My Favorite Season (1985) as Liu Xiang‑mei
 Crazy Romance (1985) as Cheung Ka-ka
 Ba Fan keng kou de xin niang (1985)
 Aces Go Places IV (1986) as Supt. Nancy Ho
 Lucky Stars Go Places (1986) as Quito
 Passion (1986) as Wendy Pai
 Immortal Story (1986) as Chang Mei Ling
 Sister Cupid (1987)
 Kidnapped (1987)
 Seven Years Itch (1987) as Sylvia
 Soursweet (1988) as Lily
 Yellow Story (1988) as Mrs. Hui
 Chicken and Duck Talk (1988) as Mrs. Hui
 All About Ah-Long (1989) as Sylvia Poon / 'Por-Por'
 Full Moon in New York (1989) as Wang Hsiung-Ping
 Eight Taels of Gold (1989) as Odds and Ends
 Two Painters (1989)
 The Fun, the Luck & the Tycoon (1990) as Hung Leung-yuk
 Queen of Temple Street (1990) as Big Sis Wah
 My Mother's Tea House (1990)
 A Rascal's Tale (1991)
 Sisters of the World Unite (1991) as Sylvia Lau
 The Banquet (1991) as Herself
 The Twin Dragons (1992) as Mrs. Ma (Twins' Mother)
 Lucky Encounter (1992) as Pregnant Woman
 C'est la vie, mon chéri (1993) as Deputy Director of Hospital
 Huan ying (1993)
 In Between (1994) as Anna Lau (segment "Yuan fu julebu")
 Eat Drink Man Woman (1994) as Jin-Rong
 Killer Lady (1995) as Show Show
 I Want to Go on Living (1995) as Pui Yan
 The Fragile Heart (1996, TV Series) as Dr. Zhao Quing
 A Chinese Ghost Story: The Tsui Hark Animation (1997) as Shine (Mandarin version, voice)
 The Red Violin (1998) as Xiang Pei (Shanghai)
 King of Stanley Market (1998)
 Tempting Heart (1999) as Cheryl
 Forever and Ever (2001) as Mrs. Tam Li Min-Chun
 20 30 40 (2004) as Lily
 Rice Rhapsody (2004) as Jen
 American Fusion (2005) as Yvonne
 The Go Master (2006) as Shu Wen - Wu's mother
 Buddha Mountain (2010) as Chang Yueqin
 Mountains May Depart (2015) as Mia
 Office (2015) as Winnie Chang
 Shuttle Life (2017) as Li Jun
 Love Education (2017) as Qiu Huiying
 Long Day's Journey into Night (2018)
 Jìyuántái qihào (2019) as Mrs. Mei
 The Garden of Evening Mists (2019) as Older Teoh Yun Ling
 Are You Lonesome Tonight? (2021) as Liang's mother
 A Light Never Goes Out (2021) as Mei-heung

As filmmaker

Discography
Kolin Records (歌林)
 1973 Never Say Goodbye 別說再見
 1974 Tearfully Say to You 含淚向你說
 1977 Farewell (惜別)
 1980 Maybe / We Were Young (也许 / 我們曾經年輕)

Rock Records
 1981 Childhood (童年)
 1985 Busy and Blind (忙與盲)
 1986 Do You Love Me? (你愛我嗎)
 1987 Xi shuo (細說), lit. "clarify" or "elaborate"
 1992 The Price of Love (愛的代價)

Awards and nominations

References

External links 

 
 Sylvia Chang at dianying.com

1953 births
Living people
Taiwanese film directors
Taiwanese women film directors
Best Actress Asian Film Award winners
Hong Kong film actresses
Hong Kong film directors
Hong Kong film producers
Hong Kong people of Taiwanese descent
Hong Kong screenwriters
Hong Kong women writers
Hong Kong writers
20th-century Hong Kong actresses
21st-century Hong Kong actresses
Taiwanese film actresses
Taiwanese film producers
Taiwanese women singers
Taiwanese screenwriters
Taiwanese stage actresses
People from Chiayi County
Taiwanese women writers
Taiwanese women film producers